Polystira picta is a species of sea snail, a marine gastropod mollusk in the family Turridae, the turrids.

Description
The size of an adult shell varies between 36 mm and 57 mm. The shell somewhat more carinated than Turris grandis, with less numerous revolving ribs. The color of the shell is yellowish white with  chestnut-brown spots upon the larger ribs, the spots often coalescing into irregular longitudinal stripes.

Distribution
This marine species occurs in the Gulf of California, Western Mexico to Colombia.

It has been found in the shallow subtidal waters of the Gulf of Tehuantepec.

References

External links
 Reeve, L. A. (1843-1846). Monograph of the genus Pleurotoma. In: Conchologia Iconica, or, illustrations of the shells of molluscous animals, vol. 1, pl. 1-40 and unpaginated text. L. Reeve & Co., London
  Todd J.A. & Rawlings T.A. (2014). A review of the Polystira clade — the Neotropic’s largest marine gastropod radiation (Neogastropoda: Conoidea: Turridae sensu stricto). Zootaxa. 3884(5): 445-491

picta
Gastropods described in 1843